Music for Loving is an album by American jazz saxophonist Ben Webster with tracks recorded in 1954 and released by Norgran in 1955. The album was reissued in 1957 by Verve as Sophisticated Lady. In 1996 Verve released a double CD compiling the album with another Norgran LP, Music with Feeling, and one by Harry Carney, Harry Carney with Strings which was first released by Clef.

Reception 

Reviewing the compilation Allmusic's Stephen Cook stated: "the two-disc Music With Feeling delivers over two hours' worth of incredible ballad interpretations. Webster, of course, made his name with many an after-hours gem, and he predictably shines here amidst the lush yet tasteful orchestral charts penned by Ralph Burns, Gerald Wilson, and Billy Strayhorn ... Forget all those bachelor-pad compilations and give this collection a spin at your next cocktail party". The Penguin Guide to Jazz selected the double CD reissue as part of its suggested Core Collection.

It was voted number 2 in the 50 All-Time Overlooked Jazz Albums from Colin Larkin's All Time Top 1000 Albums.

Track listing 
Original LP

Side A 
 "All Too Soon" (Duke Ellington, Carl Sigman) – 4:45
 "Love Is Here to Stay" (George Gershwin, Ira Gershwin) – 3:21
 "It Happens to Be Me" (Arthur Kent, Sammy Gallop) – 3:21
 "My Funny Valentine" (Richard Rodgers, Lorenz Hart) – 3:23
 "You're Mine, You" (Johnny Green, Edward Heyman) – 3:07

Side B 
 "Do Nothin' Till You Hear from Me" (Ellington, Bob Russell) – 4:43
 "Prelude to a Kiss" (Ellington, Irving Gordon, Irving Mills) – 4:46
 "Come Rain or Come Shine" (Harold Arlen, Johnny Mercer) – 4:22
 "Sophisticated Lady" (Ellington, Mills, Mitchell Parish) – 3:04
 "Love's Away" (Ben Webster) – 3:19

1995 Double CD Compilation

Disc One 
 "Chelsea Bridge" (Billy Strayhorn) – 3:56 Originally released on Music with Feeling
 "Willow Weep for Me" (Ann Ronell) – 4:38 Originally released on Music with Feeling
 "There Is No Greater Love" (Isham Jones, Marty Symes) – 3:41 Originally released on Music with Feeling
 "Teach Me Tonight" (Gene De Paul, Sammy Cahn) – 4:03 Originally released on Music with Feeling
 "Until Tonight" (Victor Young, Edward Heyman) – 4:10 Originally released on Music with Feeling 
 "We'll Be Together Again" (Carl T. Fischer, Frankie Laine) – 4:32 Originally released on Music with Feeling 
 "Blue Moon" (Richard Rodgers, Lorenz Hart) – 5:06 Originally released on Music with Feeling 
 "Early Autumn" (Stan Rhodes, Barbara Belle) –	4:49 Originally released on Music with Feeling 
 "My Greatest Mistake" (Jack Fulton, Jack "Bones" O'Brien) – 3:35 Originally released on Music with Feeling 
 "What Am I Here For" (Duke Ellington) – 3:57 Originally released on Music with Feeling 
 "All Too Soon" (Ellington, Sigman) – 4:45
 "Love Is Here to Stay" (Gershwin, Gershwin) – 3:21
 "It Happens to Be Me" (Kent, Gallop) – 3:21
 "Do Nothin' Till You Hear from Me" (Ellington, Bob Russell) – 4:43
 "Prelude to a Kiss" (Ellington, Irving Gordon, Irving Mills) – 4:46
 "Come Rain or Come Shine" (Harold Arlen, Johnny Mercer) – 4:22
 "Love Is Here to Stay" [alternative take] (George Gershwin, Ira Gershwin) – 3:17 Previously unissued	
 "Love Is Here to Stay" [alternative take] (George Gershwin, Ira Gershwin) – 3:16 Previously unissued

Disc Two 
 "Some Other Spring" (Arthur Herzog Jr., Irene Kitchings) – 4:46 Previously unissued
 "When Your Lover Has Gone" (Einar Aaron Swan) – 3:37 Previously unissued
 "Stars Fell on Alabama" (Frank Perkins, Parish) – 4:32 Previously unissued
 "Under a Blanket of Blue" (Jerry Livingston, Al J. Neiburg, Marty Symes) – 3:17 Previously unissued
 "Stars Fell on Alabama" [alternate take] (Perkins, Parish) – 4:40 Previously unissued
 "Under a Blanket of Blue" [alternate take] (Livingston, Neiburg, Symes) – 3:31 Previously unissued
 "Under a Blanket of Blue" [alternate take] (Livingston, Neiburg, Symes) – 3:20 Previously unissued
 "My Funny Valentine" (Rodgers, Hart) – 3:23
 "You're Mine, You" (Green, Heyman) – 3:07
 "Sophisticated Lady" (Ellington, Mills, Parish) – 3:04
 "Love's Away" (Webster) – 3:19
 "Almost Like Being in Love" (Frederick Loewe, Alan Jay Lerner) – 3:59
 "I Don't Stand a Ghost of a Chance with You" (Victor Young, Ned Washington, Bing Crosby) – 5:48 Originally released on Harry Carney with Strings
 "Take the "A" Train" (Billy Strayhorn) – 4:48 Originally released on Harry Carney with Strings
 "We're in Love Again" (Harry Carney) – 3:41 Originally released on Harry Carney with Strings
 "Chalmeau" (Carney) – 3:38 Originally released on Harry Carney with Strings
 "Moonlight on the Ganges" (Sherman Myers, Chester Wallace) – 3:41 Originally released on Harry Carney with Strings
 "It Had to Be You" (Isham Jones, Gus Kahn) – 4:17 Originally released on Harry Carney with Strings
 "My Fantasy" (Carney) – 4:08 Originally released on Harry Carney with Strings
 "I Got It Bad (and That Ain't Good)" (Ellington, Paul Francis Webster) – 4:22 Originally released on Harry Carney with Strings

Personnel 
Ben Webster - tenor saxophone (all tracks except CD - 2:13-20)
March 30, 1954 at Fine Sound, New York City: LP - A:4 & 5 and B:4 & 5, CD - 2:8 to 11
Teddy Wilson – piano
Ray Brown – bass
Jo Jones – drums
May 28, 1954 at Fine Sound, New York City: LP - A:1-3, CD - 1:1, 11-13, 17 & 18 and 2:12
Tony Scott – clarinet
Mac Ceppos, Richard Dickler, Milt Lomask, David Novales, Misha Edward Russell, Rudolph Sims 
Billy Strayhorn – piano, arranger
George Duvivier – bass
Louis Bellson – drums
String section directed by Ralph Burns
David Novales, Mac Ceppos, Mischa Russell – violin
Richard Dickler – viola
Rudolph Sims – cello
December 13, 1954 at Fine Sound, New York City: Harry Carney with Strings CD - 2:13-20
Harry Carney – baritone saxophone
Ray Nance – trumpet, violin
Tony Miranda – French horn
Jimmy Hamilton – clarinet, tenor banjo
Billy Bauer – guitar
Leroy Lovett – piano
Wendell Marshall  – bass
Louie Bellson – drums
String section arranged and conducted by Ralph Burns
Ben Gerrard, Eugene Orloff, Howard Kay, Isadore Zir, Mac Ceppos, Martin Donegan, Sylvan Shulman, Zelly Smirnoff – violin
Alan Shulman, Doris Johnson, Sidney Edwards – cello
December 15, 1954 at Fine Sound, New York City: LP - B:1-3, CD - 1:2 & 14-16
Jimmy Hamilton – clarinet
Danny Bank – baritone saxophone
Teddy Wilson – piano
Wendell Marshall – bass
Louis Bellson – drums
String section arranged and conducted by Ralph Burns
Jack Zayde, Julius Schachter, Leo Kruczek, Solomon Deutsch – violin
Burt Fisch – viola
Bernard Greenhouse – cello
February 3, 1955 at Fine Sound, New York City: CD:2:1-7
Teddy Wilson – piano
Unidentified orchestra
September 9, 1955 in New York City: CD - 1:3-10
Danny Bank – flute, clarinet
Al Epstein – clarinet, English horn, bass clarinet
Hank Jones – piano
Chet Amsterdam, Wendell Marshall – bass
Osie Johnson – drums
String section arranged and conducted by Ralph Burns
Eugene Orloff, Harold Colletta, Harry Lookofsky, Leo Kruczek, Martin Donegan, Paul Winter, Tosha Samaroff – violin
Burt Fisch – viola
Abram Borodkin, George Ricci, Lucien Schmit – cello

References 

1954 albums
Ben Webster albums
Albums produced by Norman Granz
Verve Records albums
Norgran Records albums